Steam heating usually means steam heating as a type of central heating system.

For related articles on Steam heating see:

 District heating
 Geothermal heating
 Seattle Steam Company
 Steam generator (railroad)

See also 
 Steam Heat, a show tune song